The 2007 Toledo Rockets football team represented the University of Toledo during the 2007 NCAA Division I FBS football season. They competed as a member of the Mid-American Conference (MAC) in the West Division. The Rockets were led by head coach Tom Amstutz.

Schedule

References

Toledo
Toledo Rockets football seasons
Toledo Rockets football